{
  "type": "ExternalData",
  "service": "geoline",
  "ids": "Q1431592",
  "properties": {
    "stroke": "#800080",
    "stroke-width": 6
  }
}
The ERL KLIA Ekspres is an express airport rail link servicing the Kuala Lumpur International Airport (KLIA) in Malaysia. It runs from KL Sentral, the main railway station of Kuala Lumpur to KLIA as well as its low-cost terminal, klia2. The line is one of the two services on the Express Rail Link (ERL) system, sharing the same tracks as the KLIA Transit. The KLIA Transit stops at all stations along the line, whereas the KLIA Ekspres runs as a direct non-stop express service between KL Sentral and KLIA/klia2. The is operated by Express Rail Link Sdn. Bhd. (ERL). Unlike most railways in Malaysia, it uses standard gauge instead of metre gauge.

The line is one of the components of the Klang Valley Integrated Transit System. It is numbered  and coloured purple on official transit maps.

Line information 
KLIA Ekspres serves three stations. The service runs non-stop from KL Sentral to KLIA and klia2, skipping the three KLIA Transit stops in between.

At KL Sentral, the two platforms of the ERL are accessed from different parts of the station building. The KLIA Ekspres side platforms are accessed from the KL City Air Terminal (KL CAT) while the KLIA Transit island platform is accessed from the main Transit Concourse at Level 1. At KLIA and klia2, both KLIA Ekspres and KLIA Transit share the same island platform for both north-bound and south-bound trains.

Extension 

A  extension to the klia2 terminal was completed in 2013. Commercial service began on 1 May 2014, when klia2 opened. Inter-terminal travel time from KLIA Main Terminal to the new terminal is 3 minutes with a fare of RM2.

Rolling stock

History

Accidents 
On 24 August 2010, Express Rail Link suffered their first reported accident, in which 3 passengers were injured. Two ERL trains collided at Kuala Lumpur Sentral, Of the trains involved one of them was about to depart at 9:45 pm for Kuala Lumpur International Airport while the other train, which was empty, rammed into its rear.

Suspension 
On 4 April 2020, due to the Malaysian movement control order, which resulted in a significant reduction in ridership, all ERL rail services were temporarily suspended. Limited ERL services recommenced on 4 May 2020 with KLIA Transit service patterns.

Operations

Timetable 
The KLIA Ekspres service officially began operations on 14 April 2002 connecting Kuala Lumpur with the Kuala Lumpur International Airport. The non-stop 57-kilometer journey takes around 28 minutes with trains departing at 15-minute intervals during peak hours and 20-minute intervals during off-peak hours.

First train: 05:00
Last train: 00:55
Peak Hours: 05:00 - 09:00 and 16:00 - 22:00
Off-Peak Hours: 09:00 - 16:00 and 22:00 - 00:55

Ticketing 

Travellers from KL Sentral to KLIA and klia2 can purchase the tickets to board the KLIA Ekspres at the KL City Air Terminal (KL CAT) which is an integral part of the KL Sentral transport hub while travellers from KLIA and klia2 to KL Sentral must purchase their tickets before boarding in order to pass through the automated barriers at KL Sentral.

Ticketing is done either by automated ticketing machines or by ticketing staff at the stations. A one-way trip costs RM55 (increased from RM35 on 1 January 2016) from KL Sentral to KLIA/klia2 and vice versa.

The validity of purchased tickets is as follows:
Standard One-Way Ticket: 3 months
Standard Two-Way Ticket:
First trip - 3 months
Second trip - 3 months after the first trip

Electronic Payment

Passengers holding a Visa payWave credit card are able to use their cards at special fare gates when entering or leaving the pay area at all stations applicable to KLIA Ekspres and KLIA Transit.

All fare gates accept Touch 'n Go cards if the card contains sufficient funds. A minimum balance of RM20 is required. The automated fare collection (AFC) systems including high-speed fare gates (ACG), passenger service machine (PSM), MiFare smartcard tickets, Station Software and Central Management System (CMS) are provided by Longbow Technologies based in Malaysia.

Unfortunately, Touch 'n Go card users can no longer access the airline check-in counters at KL Sentral using their Touch 'n Go card, as of June 2015. While the Touch 'n Go card can still be used to board the KLIA Ekspres itself, passengers will need to check-in for their flights at KLIA instead.

Air travel facilities 
On 13 July 2007, Express Rail Link Sdn Bhd, the operator of KLIA Ekspres, announced that from 23 July 2007 onwards, all 43 airlines serving KL International Airport may use the check-in facilities at KL CAT. However, only Emirates, Malaysia Airlines, Cathay Pacific, Etihad Airways and Royal Brunei Airlines flights may check-in at KL CAT before boarding the train.

Passenger service and amenities 

Passengers with laptops and smartphones have access to a high-speed internet connection free of charge through WiFi on board all KLIA Ekspres trains as well as on the station platforms. The service is powered by Yes 4G of Yes Communications, a subsidiary of the YTL Corporation which holds a 50% share over the train service.

A disabled-friendly unisex lavatory is available on board all KLIA Ekspres trains (except CRRC Changchun Equator EMUs). Restrooms are also located on the departure platform at KL Sentral. There are no restrooms on the KLIA boarding platform. Passengers waiting there are expected to use the restrooms on the main terminal's upper floor levels.

Connection to Subang Airport 
The KLIA Ekspres (and KLIA Transit) interchanges with KTM's Skypark Link at KL Sentral, an airport-rail link serving the Sultan Abdul Aziz Shah Airport (Subang Airport). This allows for a rail connection between KLIA, klia2 and Subang Airport.

Ridership 

On 19 September 2005, the company celebrated its 10 millionth passenger on the KLIA express. The 10 millionth passenger was Emylia Rosnaida who won a business class return trip to New York City from Kuala Lumpur.

The 20 millionth passenger milestone was achieved on 12 December 2007 by Mr Sockalingam, which won economy class ticket to Dubai.

Gallery

See also 
 Express Rail Link
 KLIA Transit
 Public transport in Kuala Lumpur

References

External links 

KLIA Ekspres – official website
KLIA Express - Fastest Airport Transfer in Kuala Lumpur

2002 establishments in Malaysia
Express Rail Link
Railway services introduced in 2002
Kuala Lumpur International Airport
25 kV AC railway electrification